The 2010 South American Cross Country Championships took place on February 27, 2010.  The races were held at the Campus La Salle in Guayaquil, Ecuador.  A detailed report of the event was given for the IAAF.

Complete results and results for junior and youth competitions were published.

Medallists

Race results

Senior men's race (12 km)

Note: Athletes in parentheses did not score for the team result.

Junior (U20) men's race (8 km)

Note: Athletes in parentheses did not score for the team result.

Youth (U18) men's race (4 km)

Note: Athletes in parentheses did not score for the team result.

Senior women's race (8 km)

Note: Athletes in parentheses did not score for the team result.

Junior (U20) women's race (6 km)

Note: Athletes in parentheses did not score for the team result.

Youth (U18) women's race (3 km)

Note: Athletes in parentheses did not score for the team result.

Medal table (unofficial)

Note: Totals include both individual and team medals, with medals in the team competition counting as one medal.

Participation
According to an unofficial count, 82 athletes from 7 countries participated.  The announced athlete from  did not show.

 (22)
 (7)
 (7)
 (26)
 (17)
 (1)
 (2)

See also
 2010 in athletics (track and field)

References

South American Cross Country Championships
South American Cross Country Championships
South American Cross Country Championships
International athletics competitions hosted by Ecuador
Cross country running in Ecuador
21st century in Guayaquil
Sports competitions in Guayaquil
February 2010 sports events in South America